Maples Cottage is a historic cottage in Westborough, Massachusetts, USA. Located on the former grounds of the Lyman School for Boys, this Greek Revival cottage was built in 1832 by Rev. William White on the site of a 1725 parsonage. The property was acquired by the state in 1884, and used as part of the reform school, which is now closed.  The building has lost most of its exterior Greek Revival styling (see photo).

The cottage was listed on the National Register of Historic Places in 1980, and included in the historic district encompassing the Lyman School in 1994.

See also
National Register of Historic Places listings in Worcester County, Massachusetts

References

Houses in Worcester County, Massachusetts
Houses completed in 1830
Buildings and structures in Westborough, Massachusetts
Houses on the National Register of Historic Places in Worcester County, Massachusetts
Historic district contributing properties in Massachusetts
1830 establishments in Massachusetts